Joe Nathan Wilson (November 1, 1922 – August 13, 2015) was an American politician in the state of Iowa. Wilson was born in Centerville, Iowa. He attended the University of Washington Law School and was a farmer. He also served in World War II in the United States Navy. He was a Republican State Senator from Appanoose County from 1961 to 1965. Wilson died in August 2015 at the age of 92. He was interred in Unionville Cemetery in Unionville, Appanoose County, Iowa.

References

1922 births
2015 deaths
United States Navy personnel of World War II
Farmers from Iowa
Iowa Republicans
People from Centerville, Iowa
University of Washington School of Law alumni